Young Island is the northernmost and westernmost of the three main islands in the uninhabited Balleny Islands group located in the Southern Ocean.

The island is roughly semi-oval in shape, with a long straight east coast and a curved west coast meeting at Cape Scoresby in the south and Cape Ellsworth in the north. It is entirely covered with snow. An explosive VEI-7 eruption occurred from Young Island 1,700,000 years ago.

Several small islets lie in the channel separating Cape Scoresby and Buckle Island, the largest of which is Borradaile Island. Several sea stacks lie off the island's northern tip. These are known as the Seal Rocks.

The island forms part of the Ross Dependency, claimed by New Zealand (see Antarctic territorial claims).

On some days near the Southern Hemisphere summer solstice, Young Island is the first place on land to have a sunrise - that is, the sun sets very briefly, and then rises again earlier in the day than anywhere else on Earth.

See also 
 List of Antarctic islands south of 60° S

References

External links

Stratovolcanoes of New Zealand
Volcanoes of the Balleny Islands
Islands of the Balleny Islands
Volcanic islands
VEI-7 volcanoes
Pleistocene stratovolcanoes